Lieutenant General Mohammad Ahmed Zaki, PVSM, AVSM, VrC (born 20 January 1935, Hyderabad, Telangana) is a retired Indian Army general. He was born in a Hyderabadi family with a long history of service in the Nizam's Army. His father was a retired Brigadier in the Nizam's Cavalry forces.

Biography
Zaki was educated at the Rashtriya Indian Military College, Dehra Dun from 1947 to 1951. He was selected for the National Defence Academy in 1952 and on getting commissioned in the Indian Army, he joined 19 Maratha Light Infantry in 1955.

In the Indo-Pakistani War of 1965, Zaki was wounded in the battle of Thatti Jaimal Singh and was awarded "Vir Chakra" for a conspicuous display of gallantry in the face of the enemy:

Major Mohammad Ahmad Zaki (IC-7613), 19 Bn., The Maratha Regiment.

(Effective date of award - 20th September 1965)

Major Mohammad Ahmad Zaki was in command of the leading assaulting company of his battalion near Thatti Jaimal Singh in the Lahore Sector. On 20 September 1965, his company came under heavy medium machine gun, rifle and Browning fire and he was injured in the shoulder and arm by a burst of medium machine gun fire. Still he led a determined assault on the enemy He was wounded again. Undaunted by his successive injuries, he drove home the assault in what was virtually hand-to hand fighting. With a hand grenade he himself destroyed an enemy bunker containing a medium machine gun. At this stage he fell exhausted due to profuse bleeding, but inspired by his determined efforts, his company annihilated the enemy and captured the objective. In this battle, Major Zaki showed inspiring leadership, courage and dedication to duty, in the highest traditions of the Indian Army.

During the Indo-Pakistani War of 1971, he was in command of 2 Maratha LI (Kali Panchvin) in the Shakargarh area. He has held many important appointments such as Instructor at the Infantry School, Mhow, Brigade Major in Ladakh and Instructor at the Defence Services Staff College, Wellington.

In March 1976, he raised 18 Maratha LI. He was promoted to the rank of Brigadier and took over the command of 86 Infantry Brigade in Punjab. In 1984-85, he became DIG Mizoram Range (Assam Rifles). He was awarded the Ati Vishisht Seva Medal and promoted to the rank of Major General. In August 1985, he assumed the command of the Telangana, Tamil Nadu, Karnataka, Kerala and Goa area. Later, he was posted as General Officer Commanding, 19 Infantry Division in Jammu and Kashmir from 1986-87.

Further elevated to the rank of Lieutenant General in 1988, he took over as Director General Infantry. He was corps commander of the Srinagar corps when there was an outbreak of insurgency in Kashmir. General Zaki was awarded the Param Vishisht Seva Medal in 1991. He took over as Commandant of the Indian Military Academy, Dehradun in June 1991. After that, he was appointed an Advisor to the Governor of Jammu and Kashmir. He retired from the Indian Army on 31 January 1993, after nearly 38 years of service. He then had a second stint as Advisor to the Governor, Jammu and Kashmir from 1993 to 1995. General Zaki was awarded the Padma Shri by the Government of India in 2001 for his services to the nation.

Honours and decorations

Dates of rank

See also
 Hyderabadi Muslims
 Golkonda
 Hyderabad State
 India
 Muslim culture of Hyderabad
 History of Hyderabad for a history of the city of Hyderabad.
 Hyderabad (India) for the city.

References 

 Jamia Millia Islamia (Central University)

1935 births
Living people
Indian Muslims
Recipients of the Padma Shri in civil service
Indian generals
Rashtriya Indian Military College alumni
Jamia Millia Islamia
Military personnel from Hyderabad, India
Recipients of the Vir Chakra
Academic staff of the Defence Services Staff College